Hagay Goldenberg (born 15 September 1990) is an Israeli footballer who plays for Hapoel Nof HaGalil.

Notes

1990 births
Living people
Israeli footballers
Maccabi Petah Tikva F.C. players
Maccabi Netanya F.C. players
Hapoel Ironi Kiryat Shmona F.C. players
Hapoel Hadera F.C. players
Bnei Sakhnin F.C. players
Hapoel Nof HaGalil F.C. players
Beitar Jerusalem F.C. players
Israeli Premier League players
Liga Leumit players
People from Oranit
Israeli settlers
Association football fullbacks